Cochlostyla mirabilis is a species of small, air-breathing land snail, a terrestrial pulmonate gastropod mollusk in the family Camaenidae, subfamily Helicostylinae.

Distribution
This terrestrial species can be found in the Philippines.

References

External links
Zipcodezoo
Biologie.uni
Organism Names
Encyclopedia of Life
 Wood, W. (1828). Supplement to the Index Testaceologicus; or A catalogue of Shells, British and Foreign. Richard Taylor, London. Iv [+1 + 59 pp., plates 1-8]
 Lamarck [J.-B. M. de. (1815-1822). Histoire naturelle des animaux sans vertèbres, présentant les caractères généraux et particuliers de ces animaux, leur distribution, leurs classes, leurs familles, leurs genres, et la citation des principales espèces qui s'y rapportent; précédée d'une introduction offrant la détermination des caractères essentiels de l'animal, sa distinction du végétal et des autres corps naturels; enfin, l'exposition des principes fondamentaux de la zoologie. Paris: 7 volumes.]
 Pilsbry, H. A. (1891-1892). Manual of conchology, structural and systematic, with illustrations of the species, Second series: Pulmonata. Vol. VII. Helicidae Vol. V. 225 pp. Philadelphia: Conchological Section, Academy of Natural Sciences
 Hidalgo, J. G. (1896). Catalogue de espèces du genre Cochlostyla, Férussac, que vivent dans les Iles Philippines. Journal de Conchyliologie. 44: 237-353.
 Hidalgo, J. G. (1896). Observations sur quelques Cochlostyla des Philippines. Journal de Conchyliologie. 44: 5-46
 Reeve, L.A. (1851-1854). Monograph of the genus Helix. In: Reeve, L.A. (ed.) Conchologia Iconica, 7: 210 plates, 1495 species (without pagination). London

Camaenidae